Yousef El Nasri Serhani (born 28 July 1979 in Larache, Morocco) is a Spanish long-distance runner.

He finished fifth in the 3000 metres at the 1999 IAAF World Indoor Championships
and eleventh in the short race at the 2003 World Cross Country Championships.

Personal bests
1500 metres - 3:38.07 min (1999)
3000 metres - 7:39.80 min (1999)
5000 metres - 13:17.39 min (2000)

External links

Spanish Olympic Committee

1979 births
Living people
Spanish male middle-distance runners
Spanish male long-distance runners
Athletes (track and field) at the 2000 Summer Olympics
Olympic athletes of Spain
Spanish sportspeople of Moroccan descent
Moroccan emigrants to Spain